Niš rebellion may refer to:

 Niš rebellion (1821)
 Niš rebellion (1835)
 Niš rebellion (1841)